Parque Metropolitano de Guadalajara is a public park in Zapopan, in the Mexican state of Jalisco. It holds many events, like concerts, public screening of movies, and food festivals. It has a space for soccer (MetroGol) and a special area for dogs (MetroCan).

References

External links

 

Parks in Jalisco
Zapopan